
Gmina Główczyce is a rural gmina (administrative district) in Słupsk County, Pomeranian Voivodeship, in northern Poland.

Villages
Gmina Główczyce contains the villages and settlements of Ameryka, Będziechowo, Będzimierz, Borek Skórzyński, Budki, Bukowski Młyn, Cecenówko, Cecenowo, Choćmirówko, Choćmirowo, Ciemino, Czarny Młyn, Dargoleza, Dochówko, Dochowo, Drzeżewo, Gać, Gatka, Główczyce, Górzyno, Gorzysław, Gostkowo, Izbica, Karolin, Karpno, Klęcinko, Klęcino, Kokoszki, Lipno, Lisia Góra, Michałowo, Mokre, Murowaniec, Następowo, Nowe Klęcinko, Olszewko, Pękalin, Pobłocie, Podole Wielkie, Przebędowo Słupskie, Rówienko, Równo, Rumsko, Rzuski Las, Rzuszcze, Siodłonie, Skórzyno, Stowięcino, Święcino, Szczypkowice, Szelewo, Warblino, Wielka Wieś, Wolinia, Wykosowo, Zawada, Żelkowo, Zgierz, Zgojewko, Zgojewo and Żoruchowo.

Neighbouring gminas
Gmina Główczyce is bordered by the gminas of Damnica, Nowa Wieś Lęborska, Potęgowo, Słupsk, Smołdzino and Wicko.

References
Polish official population figures 2006

Glowczyce
Słupsk County